The Mount Zion United Methodist Church is a historic Methodist church located near Crabtree, Haywood County, North Carolina. It was built in 1883, and is a three bay by four bay rectangular gable front brick church.  The church has been altered significantly during three separate rehabilitation projects undertaken since 1950.  It is probably the oldest church building remaining in Haywood County.

It was listed on the National Register of Historic Places in 1986.

References

Churches on the National Register of Historic Places in North Carolina
Churches completed in 1883
19th-century Methodist church buildings in the United States
Churches in Haywood County, North Carolina
United Methodist churches in North Carolina
National Register of Historic Places in Haywood County, North Carolina